Saraswati Education Society's High School and Junior College, more commonly known as SES High School, is one of the oldest educational institutions in Thane city of India, located at Panchpakhadi. , Teaching pre-primary (Jr and Sr Kg), primary (1st to 4th), secondary (5th to 10th) and junior college (11th and 12th), catering to over 3,500 students and well knit team of 82 teachers. It is a cosmopolitan co-education institution. Students are admitted from Jr. K.G and imparted education up to HSC (12th) Science/Commerce in English. The high school and junior college receives a grant from the State Government whereas Primary is unaided.
The school has been recognized as one of the six best administered schools in the whole of Maharashtra by the U.G.C.

History
G. S. Shivram, born in Gopalsamudram, a small village in the Tirunelveli district of Tamil Nadu, was the founder president of Saraswati Education Society.
He started a Tamil Medium school, called S.V. with like minded people near Ghantali in Thane with 4 classrooms in the year 1952. However the strength of people opting Tamil Medium was deteriorating and there had been a demand for English medium school. Accordingly, the Saraswati Education Society was established in 1953-54 and was registered under Public Trust Acts in 1956. A.M. Kaimal was the President of the Management Society after G.S. Shivram.

Campus

The school has a large ground, surrounded by its three-storey building from three sides in U-shape. The school has three gates, a statue of Saraswati (Goddess of Knowledge) being established at the entrance of the main gate. The school has 3 Science Laboratories, namely, for Chemistry, Biology and Physics, equipped in accordance with the specifications of national examination boards. The campus possesses all the amenities for the overall development of the students: auditorium, playground, games hall (recently converted into a auditorium hall with AC), audio visual room, music room, drawing room. Classrooms are spacious (average area: 500 sq. ft.), well ventilated and have lighting arrangements as per standards. There are smartboards in each and every classroom for the quick concept grasping of various subjects for the students.

Alumni

 Umang Kale,  Wildlife/Environment journalist
 Dr Anagha Kale Joshi Radiologist MD prof and head of dept of Radiology Lokmanya Tilak Municipal Medical college and general hospital Sion,  Mumbai.  Avid TT player

Students' Council
The council plays an important role in helping to maintain the discipline of the school and to co-ordinate various co-curricular activities under the able guidance of council in charge teacher. It inculcates leadership quality and incorporates a sense of responsibility among students.

Composition

Students' Council is a body divided into four departments, namely, Discipline, Culture, Fine Arts and Sports. Each department is headed by a male and a female elected secretary of First Year Junior College (FYJC). In addition, 10 members are selected from FYJC, to assist the council. From the school, each standard from 5th to 8th, sends 1 representative (other than class-monitor) from each division (each standard has four divisions); and 10 members are selected from the 9th standard, to assist the council.

Thus, in all, the Council is made up of 56 members. To lead them, a Chairman is elected by the Junior College, and a Vice-Chairman is nominated from the 9th standard. The term of the Council is one year and every year, new members form part of the Council. Two teachers-in-charge are appointed to guide the council.

See also
 Thane
 Panchpakhadi

References

Education in Thane
Junior colleges in Maharashtra
Schools in Thane district